Selurampanel (INN, code name BGG492) is a drug closely related to the quinoxalinedione series which acts as a competitive antagonist of the AMPA and kainate receptors and, as of 2015, is being investigated in clinical trials by Novartis for the treatment of epilepsy. It has also been studied in the acute treatment of migraine, and was found to produce some pain relief, but with a relatively high rate of side effects.

References

AMPA receptor antagonists
Anticonvulsants
Antimigraine drugs
Kainate receptor antagonists
Pyrazoles
Quinazolines
Sulfonamides